Nick Brooke (born December 26, 1968) is an American composer, musician, arranger, thereminist, instrument builder, and researcher of early musical automata. He was born in Manchester, New Hampshire.

Brooke mixes musical sampling, lipsynching, and theater into an idiosyncratic genre. In many of his works, vocalists and actors are trained to mimic sampled collages of sound effects, pop songs, and musical ephemera, blurring the line between recording and live performance.

Brooke’s instrumental works have been performed by the Paul Dresher Ensemble, the Nash Ensemble of London, Orchestra 2001, Dan Druckman, Speculum Musicae, and New York’s Gamelan Son of Lion. During a two-year fellowship in Central Java, Brooke studied gamelan and collaborated on musical projects with Javanese composers, dancers, and visual artists.

His work Tone Test received its premiere at the Lincoln Center Festival in 2004. Previews on NPR and in the New York Times documented its innovative aesthetic.

His 2013 album, Border Towns (Innova Recordings), was inspired by Mexican "border blasters," high-powered radio stations that encroached on U.S. broadcast airspace during the 1950s.

Brooke holds degrees in music composition and philosophy from Oberlin College, and a Ph.D from Princeton. He teaches at Bennington College.

External links
 Official web site
 Nick Brooke's Tone Test at American Opera Projects
 Nick Brooke profile at Continuum Contemporary Music
 "Nick Brooke: The Artful Appropriator", at New Music Box, October 15, 2004
 Review of Brooke's Border Towns theatrical production, New York Times, September 15, 2010
 Review of Brooke's Tone Test, New York Times, September 8, 2002

American male composers
21st-century American composers
People from Manchester, New Hampshire
Living people
1968 births
Bennington College faculty
Oberlin College alumni
21st-century American male musicians